A list of notable Azerbaijani sculptors:

A 
 Fuad Abdurahmanov

E 
 Omar Eldarov

G 
 Jalal Garyaghdi

M 
 Tokay Mammadov

S 
 Fuad Salayev

 
Sculptors
Azerbaijani sculptors